is a passenger railway station  located in the town of Kōfu, Tottori Prefecture, Japan. It is operated by the West Japan Railway Company (JR West).

Lines

Station layout
The station consists of one ground-level side platform and one ground-level island platform. The station building is adjacent to the side platform and connected with the island platform by a footbridge. The station building is a multi-purpose facilities and also contains the Kōfu Town Chamber of Commerce and Industry.

Platforms

Adjacent stations

History
Ebi Station opened on March 25, 1922. With the privatization of the Japan National Railways (JNR) on April 1, 1987, the station came under the aegis of the West Japan Railway Company.

Passenger statistics
In fiscal 2018, the station was used by an average of 104 passengers daily.

Surrounding area
 Kōfu Town Hall

See also
List of railway stations in Japan

References

External links 

 Ebi Station from JR-Odekake.net 

Railway stations in Tottori Prefecture
Stations of West Japan Railway Company
Hakubi Line
Railway stations in Japan opened in 1922